The OMG standard (Open Municipal Geodata standard)  seeks to promote the free flow of information between government agencies and citizens by establishing a common set of technical standards for organizing and sharing public data.

Summary
The OMG standard specifically targets data at the city and municipal agency levels. Of interest is address-level data that is in digital format, but resides in private databases and is not accessible by citizens at a moment's notice.

Open – Freely accessible and available (as determined by the principles below)
Municipal – Of or pertaining to a town or city or its local government
Geodata – Geographical data: any data or information that has a location or address element
Standard – An approved model or methodology

Goals
Founded on the idea that public data is not truly public if it is not freely accessible, the OMG standard project has several goals:

 To develop an open technical standard for the structuring and sharing of public geodata
 To develop a library of case-studies, documentation and source materials supporting the benefits of making public geodata easily accessible
 To help build and empower a broad community of citizens and government officials working to foster adoption of the standard by their local governments

Benefits
To governments

 Reduce time, effort and resources in fulfilling public information requests
 Increase data quality by providing correct data to public from the source
 Reduce duplication of effort
 Increase data access, availability, and speed of delivery
 Improve citizen satisfaction and create good public relations with your community

To citizens

 Open access to complete, formatted data rather than relying on third party interpretations or subsets
 Information accessibility leads to greater government accountability
 Fosters better community action on social issues, e.g. crime, pollution, permits, accidents, and education
 Improves regional competitiveness by giving businesses quicker and fuller access to data

Principles of open data
In December, 2007, the Sunlight Foundation helped organize a group of 30 open government advocates to develop a set of fundamental principles for the open government data movement. The participants produced the following set of principles, which we at the OMG standard (along with many others) have adopted as a strong foundation from which to begin. (For more information, see Resource.org)

Government data shall be considered open if it is made public in a way that complies with the principles below

 Complete: All public data is made available. Public data is data that is not subject to valid privacy, security or privilege limitations.
 Primary: Data is as collected at the source, with the highest possible level of granularity, not in aggregate or modified  forms
 Timely: Data is made available as quickly as necessary to preserve the value of the data.
 Accessible: Data is available to the widest range of users for the widest range of purposes.
 Machine processable: Data is reasonably structured to allow automated processing.
 Non-discriminatory: Data is available to anyone, with no requirement of registration.
 Non-proprietary: Data is available in a format over which no entity has exclusive control.
 License-free: Data is not subject to any copyright, patent, trademark or trade secret regulation. Reasonable privacy, security and privilege restrictions may be allowed.

Data formats
The OMG standard seeks to collaboratively define an open data standard to make it easier to allow governments to share their data.  
 XOMGL – The main technical standard that shows how data should be organized, and what is required and optional.
 JSON – XOMGL can also be output as JSON for other applications.
 CSV – A stripped down CSV version of the standard is also possible, allowing smaller datafile sizes and easy reading by regular citizens.

References

External links
OMG Standard Site
OMG Standard Resources

Earth sciences data formats
Local government
Markup languages
Open formats